Manihot grahamii is a shrub or treelet in the family Euphorbiaceae, native to South America.

This fast-growing species is closely related to ‘’Manihot esculenta’’, the edible tapioca. It is native to South America.

References 

Trees of Paraguay
Trees of Argentina
Trees of Brazil
Trees of Uruguay
Manihoteae